Arthur Leong is a former association football player who represented New Zealand at international level. Born in Guangzhou, China, he emigrated to New Zealand as a two-year-old and became the first ethnic Chinese player to represent New Zealand in football.

As well as winning a Chatham Cup winners medal as captain of Hamilton Technical Old Boys on the 1st of September at The Basin Reserve, Wellington
beating Northern 4–1, Leong played two official A-international matches for the All Whites in 1962 against visitors New Caledonia, the first a 4–1 on 2 June 1962, his second a 4–2 win on 4 June. They were to be his only official matches as New Zealand played no other official matches until 1967.

In December 2013 Arthur and his wife Maureen, a retired midwife, were both awarded Community Awards  by the Hamilton City Council at a special ceremony attended by their extended family, for service to the community.

References

Year of birth missing (living people)
Living people
New Zealand association footballers
New Zealand international footballers
Chinese emigrants to New Zealand
Association footballers not categorized by position